Fratelli Patricola (Patricola Brothers) is an Italian company producing oboes and clarinets since 1976, based in Castelnuovo Scrivia, province of Alessandria.

History 

The brothers Francesco, Pietro and Biagio Patricola, woodwind instrument makers, founded their own manufactory in 1976 for the production of oboes and clarinets. In the meantime, two sons and a grandson are working as instrument builders in the family business.

Products 

According to the website, the instruments listed below are made from long-aged wood, made from Grenadilla wood (melanoxylon) with silver-plated mechanics, the higher-quality models optionally also from Bubinga (Guibourtia tessmannii) and with gold-plated mechanics. The woodworking is done with the help of CNC machines, while the mechanics are manufactured in-house by hand.

1. Oboes: a student model, a semi-professional model and a professional model ("Artista"), further an oboe d’amore in A, two models English horn in F, and an oboe musette in E.

2. Clarinets: Only clarinets with the French fingering system (Boehm) are offered, namely one model in high E (CL.1), three models in B (CL.2, CL.4 and CL.5), one model in A (CL.3) and a model in C (CL.7). The models CL.1 to CL.4 are each manufactured in two quality levels: "Virtuoso" and the higher-quality "Artista", the model CL.5 only as a Virtuoso and the model CL.7 only as an Artista. The models CL.4 and CL.5 are "Fully Boehm"-clarinets with 7 instead of 6 rings and three or two additional keys. In addition, the CL.4 models extend to the deep E (instead of E).
Deep clarinets (basset horn, alto clarinet, bass clarinet) are not produced.

The distribution of the instruments, in the conception of which the company placed great value not only on quality requirements but also on good and contemporary design, is carried out by the company itself and by dealers in Italy and a number of other countries.

Patricola instruments are played by well-known oboists and clarinetists in cultural orchestras in Italy and other countries, even outside Europe.

References

External links 

 Website
 Video: Demonstration of a clarinet CL.2 Artista Bubinga
 Video: Demonstration of a clarinet CL.2 Artista Grenadilla

Clarinet makers
Oboe makers
Manufacturing companies of Italy